The Institution of Mechanical Engineers (India) (IME India) is the professional body for mechanical engineers in Kharghar, India. Founded in 1914.

Certifications 
Certificates issued on successful completion of its bi-annual examination are no equivalent to a Degree according to the Supreme Court.

References

External links
 http://www.imeindia.in

Professional associations based in India